Kenneth Patrick Krawetz (born April 15, 1951) is a Canadian former provincial politician. He was the Saskatchewan Party member of the Legislative Assembly of Saskatchewan for the constituency of Canora-Pelly, and was Deputy Premier of Saskatchewan and Deputy Leader of the Saskatchewan Party.

Background
Krawetz was first elected to the Saskatchewan legislature in the 1995 provincial election as a Liberal. He became the Leader of the Opposition in 1996 when Jim Melenchuk was chosen Liberal Party leader as Melenchuk did not have a seat in the legislature. In 1997, Krawetz joined three other Liberal MLAs and four Progressive Conservative MLAs in leaving their respective parties in order to form the new Saskatchewan Party. Krawetz served as the interim leader of the Saskatchewan Party, until the election of Elwin Hermanson. He remained as Leader of the Opposition until the 1999 election of Saskatchewan Party leader Elwin Hermanson to the legislature.

When Brad Wall became leader of the party in 2004, he named Krawetz as Deputy Leader. Following the 2007 provincial election that saw the Saskatchewan Party take power for the first time, Wall appointed Krawetz to the cabinet as Deputy Premier and Minister of Education. In a cabinet shuffle on June 29, 2010, Wall moved Krawetz to the Finance Ministry, while Krawetz retained his post as Deputy Premier.

On April 28, 2014, Krawetz announced that he would not seek a new term in the 2016 election. Krawetz was shuffled out of the cabinet on May 21, 2015, but was given a role as Legislative Secretary on Saskatchewan-Ukraine relations.

Awards
In January 2009, Krawetz was presented with the Order of Prince Yaroslav the Wise – the highest honour a non-citizen of Ukraine can receive – by Ukraine's president, Viktor Yushchenko, in recognition of Krawetz's efforts in ensuring the passage of the Ukrainian Famine and Genocide (Holodomor Memorial Day) Act (Bill 40) through the Saskatchewan legislature; and in promoting awareness throughout the province of the Holodomor's 75th anniversary during 2007 and 2008.

References

1951 births
Living people
Canadian people of Ukrainian descent
Recipients of the Order of Prince Yaroslav the Wise
People from Rama, Saskatchewan
Members of the Executive Council of Saskatchewan
Deputy premiers of Saskatchewan
Finance ministers of Saskatchewan
Saskatchewan Party MLAs
Saskatchewan Liberal Party MLAs
21st-century Canadian politicians